Juan Sergio Velazquez is a retired Mexican-American soccer forward who played professionally in the North American Soccer League and Major Indoor Soccer League.

Born in Leon, Guanejuato, Mexico, Velazquez’ family moved to El Monte, California when he was ten. He attended Rosemead High School in Rosemead, Ca. Rosemead H.S. did not have a soccer team at the time Velazquez attended but was scouted by UCLA while he played with the Valley Germans semi pro club when he was 17.  He attended UCLA where he played on the men's soccer team in 1971 and again in 1973 and 1974.  He was a 1971 and 1973 Honorable Mention All American. Velazquez still holds the record for Most Goals in a season for UCLA scoring 28 goals in the 1973 season. On January 15, 1975, the San Antonio Thunder picked Velasquez in first round (second overall) of the North American Soccer League draft.   Six days later, the Los Angeles Aztecs traded Luis Marotte, Pedro Martinez, Renato Costa, Julio Cesar Cortez, Ricardo de Rienzo, Mario Zanotti and Blas Sanchez to the San Antonio Thunder in exchange for Velasquez and the Thunder's 1976 and 1977 first round draft picks.   Velazquez spent two seasons with the Aztecs before being traded to the Seattle Sounders in exchange for Paul Gizzi on February 2, 1977.  Velasquez also played one season for the Phoenix Inferno of the Major Indoor Soccer League.

References

External links
 MISL stats

Living people
1952 births
American soccer players
Los Angeles Aztecs players
Major Indoor Soccer League (1978–1992) players
North American Soccer League (1968–1984) players
North American Soccer League (1968–1984) indoor players
Phoenix Inferno players
Seattle Sounders (1974–1983) players
UCLA Bruins men's soccer players
People from El Monte, California
Association football forwards